State Road 555 (NM 555) is a state highway in the U.S. state of New Mexico.

Major intersections

See also

References

555
Transportation in Colfax County, New Mexico